Newport National Bank is a historic bank building located at Newport, New Castle County, Delaware. It was built in 1864, and is a -story, five bay by three bay, brick building with a gable roof. It has a two-story service wing.  The building was renovated in 1927 in the Colonial Revival style.  The buildings contained both a residence and the bank, reflecting bank rules which required that the cashier and family reside in the building as a security measure.

It was added to the National Register of Historic Places in 1993.

References

Bank buildings on the National Register of Historic Places in Delaware
Commercial buildings completed in 1864
Colonial Revival architecture in Delaware
Buildings and structures in New Castle County, Delaware
National Register of Historic Places in New Castle County, Delaware